Peter Abell (born 1939) is a British social scientist, currently professor emeritus at the London School of Economics where he has founded and directed the "Interdisciplinary Institute of Management". He has been teaching for many years at LSE's Department of Management, managerial economics and strategy group.

Work
He is known for his contribution to mathematical social science, both quantitative and qualitative. He is the author of several books on methodology and individual participation and co-operation and currently focuses on an approach he coined Bayesian narratives and on network analysis particularly the role of signed structures  in group formation and identity change.

Political activism
During the 1960s Abell was involved in demonstrations organised by the Committee of 100 in Trafalgar Square and advocated for civil disobedience and nuclear disarmament.

Selected publications
Books
 
 
 
 
 

Book chapters
 

Journal articles

References

External links
London School of Economics Staff Profile Peter Abell

1939 births
Living people
English sociologists
Academics of the London School of Economics
Alumni of the University of Leeds